Soft tennis was a discipline of the tennis competitions at the 2006 Asian Games. Competition took place from December 2 to December 8. All events were held at Khalifa International Tennis and Squash Complex.

Singles, Doubles, and Team events were held in this competition, Chinese Taipei finished first in medal table by winning three gold medals.

Schedule

Medalists

Medal table

Participating nations
A total of 67 athletes from 10 nations competed in soft tennis at the 2006 Asian Games:

References 

Official website

External links 
soft-tennis.org

 
2006
2006 Asian Games events
Asian Games